Alice Pauli (13 January 1922 – 15 July 2022) was a Swiss gallery owner, sculptor, and visual artist.

Pauli opened the Galerie Alice Pauli in Switzerland in 1962 and focused on contemporary art. The Gallery's mission was "to be carriers of images, messengers between human creation and the public."

References

1922 births
2022 deaths
Swiss centenarians
Women centenarians
Swiss women artists
Swiss sculptors
People from the Bernese Jura